The Kea Nunataks are a line of several nunataks  southeast of the summit of Mount Bird, Ross Island, Antarctica. This is one of several features near Mount Bird assigned the native name of a New Zealand mountain bird, in this case a kea. It was named by the New Zealand Geographic Board in 2000.

References

Nunataks of Ross Island